Towa may refer to:

Japanese municipalities
Tōwa, Fukushima, town in Fukushima Prefecture
Tōwa, Iwate, town in Iwate Prefecture
Towa, Kōchi, village in Kōchi Prefecture
Tōwa, Yamaguchi, former town in Yamaguchi Prefecture
Tōwa, Miyagi, which merged with eight other towns on April 1, 2005 to form Tome, Miyagi

Linguistics 
Towa language, Native American language spoken by the Jemez Pueblo people
Towa Sanyo, 17th-century textbook for teaching the Chinese language to Japanese speakers

People 
Towa Carson (born 1936), Swedish schlager singer
Tōwa Tei (born 1964), Japanese DJ, artist and record producer
Richard Towa (born 1969), Cameroonian former football player and now assistant coach
Towa Oshima (born 1979), Japanese manga artist best known for High School Girls
, Japanese footballer
, Japanese professional wrestler
, Cameroonian philosopher

Characters
Towa Kannagi, a white-haired woman who was granted longevity and slight eternal youth by drinking the blood of a mermaid which as given to her by her identical twin sister Sawa in Mermaid Forest.
Towa Higurashi, the fourteen-year-old adopted daughter of Sōta Higurashi, who is the elder twin daughter of Sesshomaru and Rin, and twin sister of Setsuna. She is the main character of Yashahime: Princess Half-Demon and its narrator.
Mary Towa, operators of Ring.EXE from MegaMan Battle Chip Challenge
Towa, nickname To-to/Eternal Mark from manga D.N.Angel'
Towa, the main antagonist in Dragon Ball Online and secondary antagonist in the Dragon Ball Xenoverse
Towa, a Anbu members in Naruto: Clash of Ninja Revolution 2
Princess Hope Delight Towa (Akagi Towa) From Go! Princess PreCure
Haiji Towa and Monaca Towa from Danganronpa Another Episode: Ultra Despair Girls
Towa Kokonoe, a teacher from Tokyo XanaduKagami of Towa, female samurai from Emerson champaign (D&D)
Towa Herschel from The Legend of Heroes: Trails of Cold Steel tetralogy
Towa from Darwin's Game
Towa, an assassin from Log Horizon
Towa, pilot & mechanic from Metal Slug Attack
Towa from Evenicle (AliceSoft)
Towa, flight attendant from Eden no OriErio Tōwa, a student and main heroine from Denpa Onna to Seishun Otoko''
Towa, protagonist from 2015 android/iOS game Kemono Friends
Towa Yuhazaki from Crimson Alive: Genesis of the Heretic
Towa, a grandmother of Diana from Pokémon 4Ever - Celebi: The Voice of the Forest
Towa Honda from Konbini Kareshi
Towa Miduchi from Towa no Quon

Japanese unisex given names